The Police ranks of French police officers denote the position of a given officer in the police hierarchy in French police forces.



Officers

Non-commissioned officers and volunteer assistant gendarmes







References 

 
Law enforcement agencies of France
National law enforcement agencies of France
 
Police ranks by country